Themistocles or Themistoklis may refer to several people:

 Themistocles, Athenian soldier and statesman
 the Decree of Themistocles, ancient Greek inscription, purported to have been issued under the guidance of Themistocles
 Themistocles Anastasiadis, birth name of Greek journalist Themos Anastasiadis (born 1958)
 Themistokles Cholevas (1926–2007), Greek basketball player
 Themistoklis Diakidis (1882–1944), Greek high jumper
 Themistocles Leftheris (born 1982), American pair skater
 Themistoklis Nikolaidis, birth name of Greek footballer Demis Nikolaidis (born 1973)
 Themistocles M. Rassias (born 1951), Greek mathematician
 Themistokles Rigas (1945-1984), Greek footballer
 Themistoklis Sophoulis (1860–1949), Greek politician
 Saint Themistocles the Martyr of Myra in Lycia, 3rd-century saint
 Sir Themistocles Zammit (1864–1935), Maltese archaeologist, historian, professor of chemistry, medical doctor, researcher and writer

Ships
 , a ship launched as Moraitis in 1907 and renamed Themistocles in 1908
 , a ship launched in 1910 and completed in 1911.

Greek masculine given names